Several Ways to Die Trying is an independent film made in 2005 by a group of college students and recent graduates.

The film was mostly shot in Lopatcong Township, New Jersey, United States. The film's writer/director as well as members of the cast and crew are residents of the township.

Plot
Several Ways to Die Trying is about a young man who wants to kill himself when no one will publish his first novel, a choose-your-own-adventure book where the outcome is always death, but can't because he has writer's block on his suicide note. While hiking to try to clear his head he encounters Molly Usie, an outcast who is determined to befriend him.

Eventually he falls for Molly, but has to decide if she's worth living for.

Cast and crew
Credited Cast
 Dan Van Winkle .... D'Artagnan Mark
 Megan Finnegan .... Molly 'Mouse' Usie
 Rocco Stefani .... Mr. Usie
 Jenny Lynn Luther .... Mrs. Mark
 Jeff White .... Lucky

Additional Cast
 Matthew Ziegel .... Baker
 Brian Dieck .... Guildenstern
 Keith Tickle .... Rosencrantz
 Andrea Jiorle .... Girl Jogger 1
 Stephanie Rath Tickle .... Girl Jogger 2
 Danielle Cogan .... Doris
 Amanda Collinge .... Girl Jogger 3

Credited Crew
 Glen Tickle .... Director/Writer
 Stephanie Bello .... Producer
 Brian Dieck .... Editor/Assistant Director/Cinematographer
 Matthew Ziegel .... Cinematographer
 Justin Ulbrich .... Cinematographer
 Matthew Sienzant .... Sound Recordist/Editor

Additional crew members
 Stephanie Rath Tickle .... Animal Wrangler
 Keith Tickle .... Production Assistant
 Michael Haller .... Weather Consultant
 Caiti Rodel .... Props Master

DVD
Several Ways to Die Trying: Wide Ruled Edition was released on DVD on December 15, 2009 through mainly online distribution. It is available for rental through Netflix.

Premiere
The film premiered at the 2005 Cape May New Jersey State Film Festival to a sold out theater on November 19, 2005, as one of the festivals "Best of Festival" selections. Ron Rollet, the festival's curator called the film "Simply the best narrative feature ever submitted to the festival."

Awards
The screenplay for the film was a quarterfinalist in the 2005 Nicholl Fellowships in Screenwriting Competition.

The film was a "Best of Festival" Selection in the 2005 Cape May New Jersey State Film Festival.

External links
 Internet Movie Database page for the film
 Filmthreat.com's review of the film
 Official website for the film
 Amazon.com listing for the DVD

2005 films
Films set in New Jersey
American independent films
Lopatcong Township, New Jersey
2005 drama films
American drama films
2000s English-language films
2000s American films